Shah Neshin may refer to:
 Shah Neshin, Gilan
 Shah Neshin, Khuzestan
 Shah Neshin, Bagh-e Malek, Khuzestan Province
 Shah Neshin, Kohgiluyeh and Boyer-Ahmad
 Shah Neshin, Kurdistan
 Shah Neshin, Yazd